Francisco Mota da Costa (born 16 February 2005) is a Portuguese handball player for Sporting CP and the Portuguese national team. He is also known by his nickname Kiko Costa.

Honours 
Portuguese Handball Cup
 Winner: 2022

Individual awards 
 All-Star team as Best right wing at the 2021 European Men's U-19 Handball Championship
 All-Star team as Best right back at the 2022 European Men's U-20 Handball Championship
 Top scorer at the 2022 European Men's U-20 Handball Championship (58 goals)

Personal life 
He is the younger brother of handball player Martim Costa. His father, Ricardo Costa, is a former handball player and the coach of Sporting CP.

References

2005 births
Living people
Portuguese male handball players
FC Porto handball players
Sporting CP handball players